Orbital is a Franco-Belgian science fiction comics series written by Sylvain Runberg, illustrated by Serge Pellé and published by Dupuis in French,  Cinebook in English, Cobolt förlag in Swedish,  in German and ReNoir Comics in Italy.

Story
The story follows a pair of Interworld Diplomatic Office (IDO) agents on their intergalactic diplomatic peace missions. The agents are Mezoke Izzua, a Sandjarrian, and Caleb Swany, a Human. The missions reveal a rich universe of various interwoven plots by various political and interest factions involving numerous cultures and races across the galaxy.

Volumes
 Cicatrices - April 2006  
 Ruptures - June 2007  
 Nomades - August 2009  
 Ravages - October 2010  
 Justice - September 2012  
 Résistance - March 2015  
 Implosion - January 2017  
 Contacts - September 2019

Translations
Since May 2009, Cinebook Ltd has been publishing Orbital. The following volumes have been released:

 Scars - May 2009  
 Ruptures - July 2009  
 Nomads - May 2011 
 Ravages - July 2011 
 Justice - February 2014 
 Resistance - August 2015 
 Implosion - November 2017 
 Contacts - April 2020

References

Bandes dessinées
Dupuis titles
French comics
Belgian comic strips
Science fiction comics
Drama comics
2006 comics debuts
Belgian graphic novels
French graphic novels